A number of steamships have been named Fechenheim, including:

, 8,112 GRT; torpedoed in 1943, declared a total loss
, 7,851 GRT; wrecked in 1955

Ship names